Williamsburg is a village in Clermont County, Ohio, United States. The population was 2,490 at the 2010 census.

History
Williamsburg was founded in 1796 by General William Lytle of the prominent Lytle family of Cincinnati. The village was named after the city of Williamsburg, Virginia. A post office called Williamsburgh was established in 1802, and the name was changed to Williamsburg in 1893.

Geography
Williamsburg is located at  (39.054788, -84.053576).

Demographics

2010 census
As of the census of 2010, there were 2,490 people, 990 households, and 634 families living in the village. The racial makeup of the village was 98.0% White, 0.5% African American, 0.2% Native American, 0.1% Asian, 0.2% from other races, and 1.0% from two or more races. Hispanic or Latino of any race were 0.5% of the population.

There were 990 households, of which 36.3% had children under the age of 18 living with them, 42.5% were married couples living together, 15.8% had a female householder with no husband present, 5.8% had a male householder with no wife present, and 36.0% were non-families. 31.5% of all households were made up of individuals, and 11.6% had someone living alone who was 65 years of age or older. The average household size was 2.46 and the average family size was 3.05.

The median age in the village was 36.6 years. 26.7% of residents were under the age of 18; 8.9% were between the ages of 18 and 24; 26.9% were from 25 to 44; 25.6% were from 45 to 64; and 11.8% were 65 years of age or older. The gender makeup of the village was 48.4% male and 51.6% female.

2000 census
As of the census of 2000, there were 2,358 people, 927 households, and 620 families living in the village. The population density was 1,235.6 people per square mile (476.7/km). There were 1,023 housing units at an average density of 536.0 per square mile (206.8/km). The racial makeup of the village was 98.69% White, 0.17% African American, 0.34% Native American, 0.08% Asian, 0.08% from other races, and 0.64% from two or more races. Hispanic or Latino of any race were 0.17% of the population.

There were 927 households, out of which 35.5% had children under the age of 18 living with them, 48.8% were married couples living together, 13.4% had a female householder with no husband present, and 33.1% were non-families. 26.8% of all households were made up of individuals, and 10.6% had someone living alone who was 65 years of age or older. The average household size was 2.50 and the average family size was 3.05.

In the village, the population was spread out, with 27.2% under the age of 18, 9.7% from 18 to 24, 31.9% from 25 to 44, 20.4% from 45 to 64, and 10.9% who were 65 years of age or older. The median age was 33 years. For every 100 females there were 88.2 males. For every 100 females age 18 and over, there were 85.4 males.

The median income for a household in the village was $37,115, and the median income for a family was $46,528. Males had a median income of $35,395 versus $24,455 for females. The per capita income for the village was $17,250. About 8.0% of families and 11.3% of the population were below the poverty line, including 15.8% of those under age 18 and 16.3% of those age 65 or over.

Education
Williamsburg has a public library, a branch of the Clermont County Public Library.

Gallery

References

Villages in Clermont County, Ohio
Villages in Ohio
Populated places established in 1796
1796 establishments in the Northwest Territory